Karri may refer to the following:

Places
Karri, Iran, a village in Iran
Karri forest, a forest type found in Australia

Species
Pterostylis karri, species of orchid
Eucalyptus diversicolor, commonly known as the karri, is a eucalypt

People
Karri (name)

See also

Kaari (disambiguation)
Kairi (disambiguation)
Karai (disambiguation)
Karbi (disambiguation)
Kari (disambiguation)
Karki (disambiguation)
Karli (disambiguation)
Karni (disambiguation)
KARR (disambiguation)
Karri Chahar Bonicheh